Johnny Ashwell (born 1 February 1954) is a Paraguayan former footballer who played for Universidad de Chile in the Primera Division of Chile.

References
 

1954 births
Living people
Paraguayan footballers
Paraguayan expatriate footballers
Universidad de Chile footballers
Expatriate footballers in Chile
Association football defenders